Carlo Cecchi (born 25 January 1939 in Florence, Tuscany, Italy) is an Italian actor.

Born in Florence, Cecchi studied under the Living Theatre and with the Workshop of Eduardo De Filippo. In 1968, he made his debut for cinema in La sua giornata di gloria. In 1971, he directed in Florence a theatre cooperative playing works by Shakespeare, Mayakovsky, Brecht, Chekhov, and Molière.

In 1992, he returned to cinema in The Death of a Neapolitan Mathematician by Mario Martone, and later worked for directors such as Bernardo Bertolucci, Pupi Avati, Ferzan Özpetek.

Selected filmography
 Hamam  (1986)
 The Red Violin (1998)
 The Good Pope: Pope John XXIII  (2003)
 Miele (2013)
 Martin Eden (2019)

References

External links

 

1939 births
Living people
Actors from Florence
Italian male film actors
Accademia Nazionale di Arte Drammatica Silvio D'Amico alumni
Italian male stage actors
20th-century Italian male actors
21st-century Italian male actors